The Light Flyweight (45-48 kg) competition at the 2016 AIBA Women's World Boxing Championships was held from 21 to 27 May 2016.

Draw

References
Draw

Light Flyweight